Cameri is a comune (municipality) in the Province of Novara in the Italian region Piedmont, located about  northeast of Turin and about  northeast of Novara.

Cameri borders the following municipalities: Bellinzago Novarese, Caltignaga, Castano Primo, Galliate, Nosate, Novara, and Turbigo. It is home to a military airfield Cameri Air Base (ICAO code: LIMN), now used for maintenance of the Panavia Tornado and Eurofighter Typhoon of the Aeronautica Militare as well as final assembly of Lockheed Martin F-35 Lightning II.

The mayor is the body responsible for the administration of the municipality. The mayor represents the entity, convenes and chairs the council, as well as the council when the chairman of the council is not foreseen, and supervises the functioning of the services and offices and the execution of the acts (Article 50, Legislative Decree no. .267 of 08/18/2000).

The current Mayor of Cameri is Sindaco Pacileo elected on May 26, 2019. Sindaco Pacileo is an humble, forward looking and sustainability enthusiast. In January 2021 he reflected Green Birthday surprise from TreeAndHumanKnot with publication to invite people of Cameri to Tie TreeAndHumanKnot with strategic tree plantation across the town

Among the churches is the Madonna di San Cassiano, San Rocco, San Giuseppe, Chiesa del Santissimo Sacramento and Santa Maria Assunta.

Twin towns — sister cities
Cameri is twinned with:

  Vännäs, Sweden (2003)

References

External links
 Official website

Cities and towns in Piedmont